Coombs (postcode: 2611) is a suburb currently under development in the Molonglo Valley district of Canberra, located within the Australian Capital Territory, Australia. It is named in honour of H. C. "Nugget" Coombs, a prominent public servant, economist, and the first Governor of the Reserve Bank of Australia. Streets and public places in Coombs are named with the theme of persons notable for public service.

Suburb amenities
The ACT Government sold land for development as a shopping centre in Coombs in 2015, and negotiations with tenants was ongoing in August 2018.

Education
The suburb is home to Charles Weston Primary School which opened in 2016 and is located between Woodberry Avenue and Madgwick Street. The school has priority enrollment for residents of Coombs and Molonglo valley suburbs Wright and Denman Prospect.
Charles Weston Primary School

References

External links

Molonglo Valley web site
Coombs Shopping centre
Charles Weston Primary School

Suburbs of Canberra
2010 establishments in Australia